Wassoulou is a cultural area and historical region in the Wassoulou River Valley of West Africa. It is home to about 160,000 people, and is also the native land of the Wassoulou genre of music.

Wassoulou surrounds the point where the borders of three present-day countries meet: Mali, Ivory Coast, and Guinea. It includes portions of southwestern Mali, northwestern Ivory Coast, and eastern Guinea. It is bordered by the Niger River to the northwest, and by the Sankarani River to the east.

The name Wassoulou is alternately spelled Wassulu, Wassalou, and Ouassalou.
Regions of Africa

Culture
Wassoulou is the birthplace of Wassoulou music, a style which blends traditional and modern influences with strong female vocalists and a pentatonic hunter's harp. Wassoulou music is one of the two forms of West African music ethnomusicologists believe to be the origin of the American blues, which developed out of music forms dating back to the American slave trade from West Africa.  Some of the most famous residents of Wassoulou include the singers Oumou Sangare, Ramata Diakite and Coumba Sidibe.

Wassoulou's cultural importance is reflected in the development of internet resources, and the creation of Radio Wassoulou broadcasting from Yanfolila.

Language
Wassoulou is also a dialect of the Eastern Maninkakan language, and is closely related to Kankan Mandinka. Speakers of Wassoulou number some 73,500 in Guinea, with 41,200 speakers estimated in Mali, where the closely related Bamanankan is also spoken. In the far northwest of Côte d'Ivoire there are some 21,000 Wassoulou speakers, where it is related to Wojenaka Maninka.

Inhabitants are known as Wassulu, Wassulunka or Wassulunke.

History
The Wassoulou area is a center for the mingling of several ethnic groups.  The nomadic Fula people, who were believed to have emigrated from the Fouta Djallon highlands to the west, integrated into the indigenous Mandé peoples and adopting their language and customs sometime prior to the 18th century, at roughly the same time Islam spread into the area. There are also large populations of Mandinka peoples native to Wassoulou.

Wassoulou is also the name of an Islamic state, the Wassoulou Empire (1870–1898), ruled by Samori Ture and centered on his capital, Bissandugu. In 1870, Samori overthrew an older Wassoulou state within the Kingdom of Kénédougou, whose faama (ruler) was Dyanabufarina Modi, and expanded his empire from there, taking the Wassoulou name.  While the history of the Mandinka Wassoulou states remain unclear, the small kingdoms of Kenedugu and Wassulu existed from at least the 1650s, benefiting from gold mining and trade in the area.

See also
 Wassoulou music
 Wassoulou Empire
 Sikasso Region
 Manding languages
 Mandinka people
 Fula people

References

Sources
 Échange école Joliot Curie, école Wassoulou, Février 2007,  Joint French - Malian Education Project (EDDUFAO), in the villages of Guéna, Djélibany and Kaka.
 Portrait of the most famous Female Griot from Wassoulou: Oumou Sangaré, Abidjan.net. 
 calabashmusic.com's guide to Wassoulou Music.
 Radio Wassoulou.
 Geekcorps Mali  » First digitally created broadcast from Radio Wassoulou - Yanfolila. October, 2004.
 Launch of the internet connection in Yanfolila USAID, 29 January 2005.
 Le Président de la République du Mali: Visit to Wassoulou, 2006
 PLAN DE SECURITE ALIMENTAIRE COMMUNE RURALE DE WASSOULOU BALLE, 2006–2010.  Projet de Mobilisation des Initiatives en matière de Sécurité Alimentaire au Mali (PROMISAM), 2006.
 Etude diagnostique pour le Marketing Social de l’Hygiène et de l’Assainissement dans les villes de Bougouni et de Yanfolila, Helvetas Mali - ASP-EAU, December 2004. (Includes detailed descriptions and basic statistics for two towns in the region).

Geography of Mali
Wassoulou region and culture
Geography of Guinea
Wassoulou region and culture
Denguélé District
Wassoulou region and culture
French West Africa